was a private junior and senior high school in Habikino, Osaka Prefecture. It is a part of the Shi-Tennoji Gakuen, a group of Buddhist educational institutions affiliated with Shitennoji temple in Osaka.

It was established in April 1984.
The school closed in 2019.

References

External links
 Shitennoji Habikigaoka Junior and Senior High School 

1984 establishments in Japan
Educational institutions established in 1984
Private schools in Japan
Buddhism in Japan
Education in Osaka Prefecture
High schools in Osaka Prefecture
Shitennō-ji